Granulopsis is a genus of minute sea snails, marine gastropod molluscs in the family Cerithiopsidae.

Species
Species in the genus Granulopsis  include:
 Granulopsis thelcterium (Tomlin, 1929)
 Granulopsis vitisabrinae Cecalupo & Perugia, 2018

References

 Tomlin J.R. le B. (1929). Two new Cerithiopsidae. Proceedings of the Malacological Socierty of London. 18(6): 264
 Cecalupo A. & Perugia I. (2012) Family Cerithiopsidae H. Adams & A. Adams, 1853 in the central Philippines (Caenogastropoda: Triphoroidea). Quaderni della Civica Stazione Idrobiologica di Milano 30: 1-262

Cerithiopsidae
Gastropod genera